En Nuestro Desafio is a CD/DVD by the instrumental rock band Tristeza. It was released in 2006 on Better Looking Records. The DVD portion contains videos for 12 songs, most of which are not on the CD.

Track listing

CD
Común
Wearing the Blues
Organ Melts You
Cuando Cuando Amor Amor
Swoop Me Up
Mirror Image
Rugidos de Mar
Pildora Amargada
En Nuestro Desafio

DVD
Peluda Azul
Delia's Dream
580
Sil
Utopia Bridge
Lagarta
Tokyo Foto
Lambs
Tricuspid
Water Falls Up
Bombas Rojas
En Nuestro Desafio

Footnotes

2006 albums
2006 video albums
Tristeza albums